Craig Alan Schoen (born May 2, 1983) is a former American professional basketball player.

High school
Schoen attended South Central Junior & Senior High School in Elizabeth, Indiana. He scored 1,922 career points at South Central where he graduated from in 2002.

College
Schoen started his college career with the Lipscomb Bisons in 2002 where he averaged six points and team high four assists per game. After his freshman year, he transferred to Kentucky Wesleyan. He averaged 12 points and 4 assists during the 2003-2004 season but was redshirted the following season  as KWC was given a one-year postseason tournament ban by the Great Lakes Valley Conference.
In the summer of 2005, he left KWC after receiving a scholarship from Georgetown College in Kentucky. During his two seasons there, he was voted to Mid-South Conference All-Conference team in 2006 and 2007.

Iceland
Schoen joined KFÍ in the Icelandic Division I for the 2008–09 season. He went on to lead the team in scoring (28.9 ppg) and assists (5.0) while guiding them to a playoff seat where they would eventually lose to Valur 1-2. During the 2009–10 season, Schoen averaged 21.7 points and league leading 6.8 assists while helping the team achieve first place and promotion to the Úrvalsdeild karla.

Schoen averaged 17.8 points, 4.3 rebounds and 5.0 assists for the 2010–2011 season but KFÍ finished with a 5–17 record and were relegated back to Division I. He returned to KFÍ for 2011–12 season and was instrumental in leading the team to a league best 17–1 record and promotion back to the Úrvalsdeild karla. For the season he averaged 16.6 points, 5.5 rebounds and league leading 7.4 assists.

Career statistics

Regular season

|-
| style="text-align:left;"| 2008–09
| style="text-align:left;"| KFÍ
| 20 || 20 || 35.6 || .585 || .436 || .843 || 5.6 || 5.0 || 3.1 || 0.2 || 28.9
|-
| style="text-align:left;"| 2009–10
| style="text-align:left;"| KFÍ
| 18 || 18 || 34.5 || .664 || .377 || .885 || 4.0 || 6.8 || 3.5 || 0.2 || 21.7
|-
| style="text-align:left;"| 2010–11
| style="text-align:left;"| KFÍ
| 21 || 21 || 34.3 || .474 || .407 || .885 || 4.0 || 5.0 || 2.9 || 0.3 || 17.8
|-
| style="text-align:left;"| 2011–12
| style="text-align:left;"| KFÍ
| 17 || 17 || 33.0 || .564 || .383 || .794 || 5.5 || 7.4 || 2.9 || 0.3 || 16.6

Personal life
Schoen's sister, Brittany, played college basketball for Indiana State and professionally in Iceland. His older brothers, Chad and Scott, played college basketball for Georgetown College.

References

External links
 Icelandic statistics at Icelandic Basketball Association

1983 births
Living people
American expatriate basketball people in Iceland
American men's basketball players
Basketball players from Kentucky
Georgetown Tigers men's basketball players
Kentucky Wesleyan Panthers men's basketball players
Lipscomb Bisons men's basketball players
Point guards
Craig Schoen
Craig Schoen